Kezab (also Romanized as Kez̄āb and Kaz̄āb) is a village in Kezab Rural District, Khezrabad District, Saduq County, Yazd Province, Iran. At the 2006 census, its population was 125, in 42 families.

References 

Populated places in Saduq County